Problepsis evanida is a moth of the  family Geometridae. It is found on Buru.

References

Moths described in 1932
Scopulini
Moths of Indonesia